City of Eternal Spring may refer to the following cities:

 Cochabamba, Bolivia
 Arica, Chile
 Kunming, China
 Medellín, Colombia
 Jarabacoa, Dominican Republic
 Cuernavaca, Mexico
 Trujillo, Peru
 Cidra, Puerto Rico
 Da Lat, Vietnam

City nicknames